Ben Klock (born 1972) is a German techno artist, DJ, and record label owner. He is resident at Berghain, a techno club in Berlin. In 2006 he founded the techno label Klockworks.

Discography

Albums
Klockworks EP (1998)
I Love You (2000)
Glow (2003)
Tag Der Arbeit (2003)
Back (2005)
Earthquake (2005)
Dettman & Klock - Dawning / Dead Man Watches the Clock (2006)
Big Time (2006)
Czeslawa / Warszawa (2007)
Dettman & Klock - Scenario (2007)
Ben Klock - Safety Scissors - Camping 01 (2007)
October (2008)
Before One (2009)
Ben Klock Remixes (2009)
One (2009)
Tracks from 07 (2010)
Compression Session (2010)
Dettmann & Klock - Dawning Revisited (2013)
Lucy & Klock - War Lullaby (2015)
Dettmann & Klock - Phantom Studies (2017)

DJ Mixes
RA.063 (2007)
FACT MIX 31 (2009)
CLR PODCAST 017 (2009)
CLR PODCAST 25 (2009)
BERGHAIN 04 (2010)
TRAX 141 (2010)
CLR PODCAST 121 (2011)
FABRIC 66 (2012)
RA.EX123 Ben Klock (2012)
BBC Radio 1's Essential mix Ben Klock (2015)
UNTITLED MIXMAG (2016)

References

External links

1972 births
German DJs
German techno musicians
Living people
People from Schöneberg
Electronic dance music DJs